The 2017 Tour of Belgium, known as the 2017 Baloise Belgium Tour for sponsorship purposes, was the 87th edition of the Tour of Belgium cycling stage race. It took place from 24 to 28 May 2017 in Belgium, as part of the 2017 UCI Europe Tour; it was categorised as a 2.HC race. Defending champion Dries Devenyns did not take part in the race, as he was taking part in the concurrent Giro d'Italia.

The race was won by Jens Keukeleire, riding for the Belgium national team. Keukeleire trailed overnight leader Rémi Cavagna by a second going into the final stage, but bonus seconds gained in the race's "golden kilometre" – where three intermediate sprint positions were held within the space of a kilometre – allowed Keukeleire to move into the lead on the road, and despite crashing in the final three kilometres, he was able to win the race by six seconds from Cavagna. Three-time race winner Tony Martin of  completed the podium, five seconds further behind Cavagna.

Teams
20 teams were selected to take part in Tour of Belgium. Five of these were UCI WorldTeams, with ten UCI Professional Continental teams, four UCI Continental teams and a Belgium national team.

Schedule
The race itinerary was announced on 23 February 2017.

Stages

Stage 1
24 May 2017 — Lochristi to Knokke-Heist,

Stage 2
25 May 2017 — Knokke-Heist to Moorslede,

Stage 3
26 May 2017 — Beveren to Beveren, individual time trial (ITT)

Stage 4
27 May 2017 — Ans to Ans,

Stage 5
28 May 2017 — Tienen to Tongeren,

Classification leadership table
In the 2017 Tour of Belgium, three different jerseys were awarded. The general classification was calculated by adding each cyclist's finishing times on each stage. Time bonuses were awarded to the first three finishers on all stages: the stage winner won a ten-second bonus, with six and four seconds for the second and third riders respectively. Bonus seconds were also awarded to the first three riders at sprints in the "golden kilometre", where three intermediate sprint positions were held within the space of a kilometre. Three seconds were awarded for the winner of the sprint, two seconds for the rider in second and one second for the rider in third. The leader of the general classification received a red jersey. This classification was considered the most important of the 2017 Tour of Belgium, and the winner of the classification was considered the winner of the race.

The second classification was the points classification. Riders were awarded points for finishing in the top ten in a stage. Unlike in the points classification in the Tour de France, the winners of all stages were awarded the same number of points.  The leader of the points classification was awarded a blue jersey.
There was also a combativity classification, where riders received points for finishing in the top five at intermediate sprint points during each stage, on a 10–8–6–4–2 scale. Bonus points were awarded if a breakaway had gained a sufficient advantage over the field, up to a maximum of 5 points. There was also a classification for teams, in which the times of the best three cyclists in a team on each stage were added together; the leading team at the end of the race was the team with the lowest cumulative time.

Final standings

General classification

Points classification

Combativity classification

Teams classification

References

External links

2017
2017 in Belgian sport
2017 UCI Europe Tour